Clément is a 2001 French drama film directed by Emmanuelle Bercot. It was screened in the Un Certain Regard section at the 2001 Cannes Film Festival.

Cast
 Olivier Guéritée as Clément
 Emmanuelle Bercot as Marion
 Kevin Goffette as Benoît
 Rémi Martin as Franck
 Lou Castel as François
 Catherine Vinatier as Aurore
 Jocelyn Quivrin as Mathieu
 David Saada as Maurice
 Eric Chadi as Julien
 Yves Verhoeven as Patrick
 Nicolas Buchoux as Barman discothèque
 Fiona Casalta as Mathilde
 Joël Curtz as Copain Clément
 Cyril Descours as Copain Clément
 Catherine Guillot as Mère Clément
 Aurélie Lepley as Copain Clément
 Damien Moratti as Copain Clément
 Eddy Okba as Copain Clément
 José Mambolongo Togbe as Videur discothèque
 Adrian Touati as Copain Clément

References

External links

2001 films
2001 drama films
2001 directorial debut films
2000s French-language films
Films directed by Emmanuelle Bercot
French drama films
2000s French films